Srpska is a village in the municipality of Podgorica, Montenegro.

History
Before Kingdom of Montenegro united with the Kingdom of Serbia and State of Slovenes, Croats and Serbs to form the Kingdom of Serbs, Croats and Slovenes in November 1918, village had been called Srska. The name was afterwards changed to Srpska , affiliating the toponym to the Serbs.

Demographics
According to the 2011 census, its population was 880.

References

Populated places in Podgorica Municipality